The Righteous Gemstones is an American television series created by Danny McBride that premiered on August 18, 2019, on HBO. The series follows a famous and dysfunctional family of televangelists. It stars McBride, John Goodman, Edi Patterson, Adam DeVine, Cassidy Freeman, Tony Cavalero, Tim Baltz, Skyler Gisondo, and Walton Goggins. In September 2019, HBO renewed the series for a second season, which premiered on January 9, 2022. In January 2022, the series was renewed for a third season.

Premise
The Righteous Gemstones depicts a family of televangelists and megachurch pastors led by widowed patriarch Eli Gemstone (John Goodman). Eli and his immature children, Jesse (Danny McBride), Judy (Edi Patterson) and Kelvin (Adam DeVine), lead opulent lives funded by church donations.

In the first season, Eli's estranged brother-in-law, Baby Billy Freeman (Walton Goggins), is brought in to lead the Gemstones' new shopping-mall-based satellite church, which leads to a conflict with Rev. John Wesley Seasons (Dermot Mulroney) whose smaller, neighboring church is threatened. Concurrently, a trio of masked figures blackmail Jesse with a scandalous video documenting the lewd behavior of him and his best friends.

In the second season, Jesse and Amber partner with Texas megachurch leaders Lyle and Lindy Lissons (Eric André and Jessica Lowe) to develop a Christian timeshare resort. The family faces threats including investigative journalist Thaniel Block (Jason Schwartzman), Junior (Eric Roberts) an old friend from Eli's criminal past, and a mysterious group of motorcycle-riding assassins.

Cast and characters

Main
 Danny McBride as Jesse Gemstone, Eli's oldest son and associate pastor of the Gemstone Salvation Center. Although appearing to be a faithful father and husband, Jesse barely conceals a crude and arrogant personality and a debauched lifestyle, which he often partakes in with his "gang" of friends and subordinates. 
 John Goodman as Dr. Eli Gemstone, the patriarch of the Gemstone family and lead pastor of the Gemstone Salvation Center. Eli is a widower, having lost his wife, Aimee-Leigh, one year prior to the start of the series. Although not as openly greedy and vulgar as his children, Eli often prioritizes his own wealth and status ahead of spirituality. 
 Adam DeVine as Kelvin Gemstone, Eli's youngest son and youth pastor of the Gemstone Salvation Center. Kelvin strives to prove himself as a leader, despite his immaturity and impulsiveness. He shares his mansion with his recent convert and friend, Keefe Chambers. 
 Edi Patterson as Judy Gemstone, Eli's daughter. Judy, the middle child, often feels underestimated by her family and is prone to neurotic and psychopathic behavior. 
 Tony Cavalero as Keefe Chambers, a dim-witted ex-Satanist and roommate of Kelvin, who works security at the Gemstone's church. Keefe reveres Kelvin as a spiritual leader.
 Cassidy Freeman as Amber Gemstone, Jesse's wife who projects the image of a supportive and loving spouse. She encourages Jesse's ambitions to take more control of the church while privately struggling with his negative qualities.
 Skyler Gisondo as Gideon Gemstone, Jesse's oldest son, who moved to California to be a stunt performer, an act that Jesse considered to be a betrayal. Gideon is a skilled martial artist.
 Walton Goggins as Baby Billy Freeman (season 1, recurring season 2), Eli's brother-in-law and brother of the deceased Aimee-Leigh Gemstone. A faded child star who was once part of a Gospel song-and-dance double-act with his sister, Baby Billy is a habitual liar whose financial dependence, bad influence on Jesse and Judy, and tendency to abandon his loved ones strained his relationship with the Gemstones. Baby Billy resides at Freeman's Gap, his and Aimee-Leigh's childhood home in the Appalachian Mountains, with his much younger wife Tiffany.
 Gregory Alan Williams as Martin Imari, Eli's right-hand-man and the Gemstones' accountant who is often entrusted with cleaning up after the family's scandals.
 Tim Baltz as Benjamin Jason "BJ" Barnes Judy's sensitive and mediocre fiancé, and later, husband. He is often intimidated by Judy, although it's apparent that he really loves her. BJ works in an optometrist's office in a local grocery store.
 Dermot Mulroney as Rev John Wesley Seasons (season 1), a pastor of a much smaller congregation, forced to compete with the Gemstones' new church in Locust Grove
 Jennifer Nettles as Aimee-Leigh Gemstone, Eli's deceased wife and mother of Jesse, Judy, and Kelvin. Nettles portrays Aimee-Leigh in flashbacks.

Recurring
 Jody Hill as Levi, a member of Jesse's "gang" and guitarist at the Gemstone Salvation Center
 James DuMont as Chad, a member of Jesse's "gang" whose marriage falls apart after the revelation of his scandalous behavior.
 Troy Anthony Hogan as Matthew, a member of Jesse's "gang"
 J. LaRose as Gregory, a member of Jesse's "gang"
 Valyn Hall as Tiffany Freeman, Baby Billy's much younger and childish wife
 Kelton DuMont as Pontius Gemstone, Jesse's second son
 Gavin Munn as Abraham Gemstone, Jesse's youngest son
 Scott MacArthur as Scotty (season 1), a stuntman and associate of Gideon's from Los Angeles
 Mary Hollis Inboden as Mandy, wife, and later, ex-wife of Chad
 Cullen Moss as Brock, a security guard at the Gemstones' family compound
 Jade Pettyjohn as Dot Nancy (season 1), Dale and Gay Nancy's rebellious teenage daughter
 Jason Schwartzman as Thaniel Block (season 2), an investigative reporter writing about the Gemstone family
 Eric Roberts as Glendon "Junior" Marsh Jr. (season 2), a professional wrestling promoter who shares a criminal past with Eli.
 Eric André as Lyle Lissons (season 2), a prominent Texas televangelist who wants to work with Jesse
 Jessica Lowe as Lindy Lissons (season 2), Lyle's wife and business partner
 Steve Zahn as Peter (season 3), a militia leader
 Kristen Johnston as May–May Montgomery (season 3), someone who has history with the Gemstone family

Guest
 Virginia Gardner as Lucy, Scotty's girlfriend and Gideon's friend
 M. Emmet Walsh as Grandaddy Roy Gemstone, Eli's father
 Toby Huss as Dale Nancy, a loose parody of Dan Cathy, and a congregant and donor to the Gemstones' church
 Marla Maples as Gay Nancy, Dale Nancy's wife
 Joe Jonas as himself, a co-investor in Zion's Landing
 Wayne Duvall as Glendon Marsh Sr., a professional wrestling promoter and organized crime figure
 Macaulay Culkin as Harmon Freeman, Baby Billy Freeman's estranged son from a previous marriage, whom he abandoned in 1993. Jeremy T. Thomas portrays a younger Harmon in flashbacks.
 John Amos as Buddy Lissons, Lyle's father

Episodes

Season 1 (2019)

Season 2 (2022)

Production

Development
On June 28, 2018, it was announced that HBO had given the production a pilot order. The episode was written and directed by Danny McBride who is also executive producer alongside Jody Hill and David Gordon Green. On October 2, 2018, it was reported that HBO had given the production a series order.

On July 1, 2019, it was announced that the series would premiere on August 18, 2019. On September 9, 2019, the series was renewed for a second season.

On January 25, 2022, HBO renewed the series for a third season.

Writing
McBride has said he intends the series to run "longer than anything we've done before," including the four-season Eastbound & Down and the two-season Vice Principals. "If I had my way, when this is done, it's like this epic, sprawling tale, like the fucking Thorn Birds or something," he told Polygon. "You’ll know everybody in this family, cousins, great uncles, all these people. In my eyes, this season is chapter one. It’s just setting the table for who all these people are and what's about to happen." Like McBride's previous television characters, the Gemstones have "an inflated sense of self." McBride comments, "To me, the idea of a minister that sees themself as bigger than God just feels like the ultimate display of that."

For the second season, Eli's backstory was inspired by the Dixie Mafia and the Memphis professional wrestling business, two subjects that have long fascinated McBride. He has stated that the Gemstones were originally inspired by Mafia families and that Eli's gangster background informs how the character runs his church in the present. He draws a parallel between wrestling and televangelism in that both businesses are built around "showmanship" and maintaining "kayfabe".

Casting
Alongside the pilot order announcement, it was confirmed that Danny McBride and John Goodman would star in the pilot. In July 2018, it was announced that Edi Patterson, Adam DeVine, Cassidy Freeman, Tony Cavalero, and Tim Baltz had also joined the pilot's main cast. In May 2021, Jason Schwartzman, Eric Roberts and Eric André joined the cast in recurring roles for the second season.

Filming
Principal photography for the pilot was completed in August 2018 in Charleston, South Carolina at Citadel Mall. The North Charleston Coliseum served as the interior of Gemstone Ministries, while a former Sears store at Citadel Mall was re-purposed into the Locust Grove Worship Center. (The new church being a former Sears was kept and referenced in the series). In April 2021, HBO confirmed the second season had gone into production, having continued to film mainly in Charleston. In September 2022, it was reported that production on the third season was shut down due to the landfall of Hurricane Ian in South Carolina.

Music
The series is composed by Joseph Stevens, who has collaborated with McBride on his previous television series. An original song "Misbehavin'" became a viral hit after its debut in the episode "Interlude". Performed by Jennifer Nettles and Walton Goggins as their characters Aimee-Leigh and Baby Billy, "Misbehavin'" is the fictional Freeman siblings' most popular song which they performed as children in the 1960s and reprised as adults in 1989. The song was written by McBride, co-star and co-writer Edi Patterson, and composer Stevens, who designed it to mimic a wholesome, old-time country song but with absurd lyrics such as "Runnin' through the house with a pickle in my mouth".

Release
On December 24, 2018, a "first look" still image from the series was released featuring Danny McBride, John Goodman, and Adam DeVine as Jesse Gemstone, Eli Gemstone, and Kelvin Gemstone, respectively. The series premiered on HBO on August 18, 2019. The second season premiered on January 9, 2022.

Home media
The first season was released on DVD, on April 14, 2020.

Reception

Critical response
For the first season, the review aggregator website Rotten Tomatoes reported a 75% approval rating with an average rating of 7.1/10, based on 65 reviews. The website's critical consensus reads: "Though it may not win many new converts, fans of Danny McBride will find much to praise in The Righteous Gemstoness darkly hilarious pews." Metacritic, which uses a weighted average, assigned the season a score of 67 out of 100, based on 20 critics, indicating "generally favorable reviews".

For the second season, Rotten Tomatoes reported a 93% approval rating with an average rating of 7.4/10, based on 14 reviews. The website's critical consensus reads: "The Righteous Gemstones second season can be as messy as its title characters, but it's hard to complain when the results are this uproariously funny. Metacritic assigned the season a score of 83 out of 100, based on 10 critics, indicating "universal acclaim".

Accolades

Notes

References

External links
 
 

2010s American black comedy television series
2020s American black comedy television series
2019 American television series debuts
English-language television shows
HBO original programming
Evangelical drama television series
Television series about dysfunctional families
Television series created by Danny McBride
Parodies of televangelism
Religious comedy television series
Television shows set in South Carolina
Television series by Home Box Office